Hannah Elise Davison (born April 9, 1997) is an American professional soccer player who plays as a defender for Rangers W.F.C. in the Scottish Women's Premier League (SWPL)

Club career

Chicago Red Stars
Davison made her NWSL debut in the 2020 NWSL Challenge Cup on July 1, 2020.

AIK
On March 11, 2021, Davison signed a two-year contract with AIK.

Rangers
On August 3, 2022, Davison joined Rangers

Honours
Rangers
 Scottish Women's Premier League Cup: 2022

References

External links
 Northwestern profile
 
 

1997 births
Living people
American women's soccer players
Soccer players from Illinois
People from Geneva, Illinois
Women's association football defenders
Northwestern Wildcats women's soccer players
Chicago Red Stars draft picks
Chicago Red Stars players
Sportspeople from Kane County, Illinois
National Women's Soccer League players
American expatriate women's soccer players
Expatriate women's footballers in Sweden
American expatriate sportspeople in Sweden